Fortschritt (German for "Progress") was an East German brand of tractors, combine harvesters and other agricultural machines made by VEB Fortschritt (part of the IFA) in Neustadt, Saxony. It was the largest agricultural machinery manufacturer in the nation.

Fortschritt was taken over by Case IH in 1997.

Companies of East Germany